The Austin Peay Governors men's basketball team represents Austin Peay State University in Clarksville, Tennessee. The Governors play in the ASUN Conference starting in 2022–23, following 61 seasons in the Ohio Valley Conference. The team's most recent appearance in the NCAA Division I men's basketball tournament to date was in 2016, making the field of 68 by virtue of having won the 2016 Ohio Valley Conference men's basketball tournament. The Governors' head coach is Corey Gipson.

The 2022–23 season will not only be Peay's first in the ASUN Conference, but also its last at its current on-campus home of Winfield Dunn Center. After that season, the Governors will move to the new F&M Bank Arena in downtown Clarksville. The new arena was originally intended to open for the 2022–23 season, but has been delayed to July 2023.

Historically, the "Governors" nickname applied only to Peay's men's teams; women's teams were known as "Lady Govs". However, since the mid-2010s, all Peay teams have used "Governors".

Rivalries
The Governors' main rival has historically been Murray State University. ESPN The Magazine featured the Austin Peay–Murray State rivalry in a February 2009 issue. However, the two schools are now in separate conferences, with Peay having joined the ASUN and Murray State the Missouri Valley Conference in July 2022.

Year-by-year results

Postseason

NCAA Division I Tournament results
The Governors have appeared in the NCAA Division I tournament seven times. Their combined record is 2–8.

NCAA Division II Tournament results
The Governors have appeared in the NCAA Division II tournament four times. Their combined record is 3–6.

NIT results
The Governors have appeared in the National Invitation Tournament (NIT) two times. Their combined record is 1–2.

CBI results
The Governors have appeared in the College Basketball Invitational (CBI) one time. Their record is 0–1.

CIT results
The Governors have appeared in the CollegeInsider.com Postseason Tournament (CIT) two times. Their combined record is 1–2.

Notable players

Retired numbers

Retired jerseys 

Notes

Professional international players
 Eli Abaev (born 1998), American-Israeli basketball player for Hapoel Be'er Sheva in the Israeli Basketball Premier League
Chris Horton (born 1994) - basketball player for Hapoel Tel Aviv of the Israeli Basketball Premier League

References

External links